Richie Shazam Khan, known artistically as Richie Shazam, is an American model, photographer, and writer.

Career

Modelling 
Shazam made her runaway debut for Vivienne Westwood. She has walked at New York Fashion Week and London Fashion Week, and has modelled for Gypsy Sport, Andreas Kronthaler, MISBHV, Fleur du Mal, and Rachel Comey.

She signed with IMG Models in March 2021.

Photography 
Shazam has shot for Interview and Thom Browne and has had her photography featured in Vogue.

In July 2020, she collaborated with Copenhagen-based fashion label Ganni to sell two of her photographs, Black Trans Lives Matter, NYC 2020 and Self Portrait, NYC 2019. All proceeds went to the Marsha P. Johnson Institute and For the Gworls. She has also sold portraits to support COVID relief in India and NYC.

Television 
Shazam co-hosted Fuse docu-series Shine True alongside Lucas Silveira.

Personal life 
Shazam was born to Guyanese immigrants and raised in Queens, New York. She attended middle school and high school in Manhattan and Brooklyn, and was often bullied by her peers. Her mother died when she was in high school. Shazam majored in international relations at Trinity College and studied in South Africa and Argentina before going on to work at a number of galleries and museums.

She is non-binary and feminine-presenting. In 2021, she began a relationship with Ben Draghi.

References

External links 
 Official Instagram page

Living people
Year of birth missing (living people)
American female models
People from Queens, New York
African-American models
American models
American photographers
Guyanese American
Non-binary models
Non-binary artists
Non-binary writers